Kampō (or Kanpō, 漢方) medicine is the Japanese study and adaptation of traditional Chinese medicine. In 1967, the Japanese Ministry of Health, Labour and Welfare approved four kampo medicines for reimbursement under the National Health Insurance (NHI) program. In 1976, 82 kampo medicines were approved by the Ministry of Health, Labour and Welfare. Currently, 148 kampo medicines are approved for reimbursement. 

The 14th edition of the Japanese Pharmacopoeia (JP) (日本薬局方 Nihon yakkyokuhō) lists 165 herbal ingredients that are approved to be used in kampo remedies. 

Tsumura (ツムラ) is the leading maker making 128 of the 148 kampo medicines. The "count" column shows in how many of these 128 formulae the herb is found. The most common herb  is Glycyrrhizae Radix (Chinese liquorice root). It is in 94 of the 128 Tsumura formulae. Other common herbs are Zingiberis Rhizoma (ginger) (51 of 128 formulae) and Paeoniae Radix (Chinese peony root) (44 of 128 formulae).

Note 1: this character cannot be displayed correctly on a computer. "庶" is usually substituted in Chinese and Japanese. The "灬" in "庶" should be replaced with "虫".
Note 2: this character cannot be displayed correctly on a computer. "梨" is usually substituted in Chinese. "梨" or "藜" is usually substituted in Japanese. The "勿" in "藜" should be replaced with "刂".

See also
Kampo list
Chinese classic herbal formula
 List of plants used in herbalism
 Pharmacopoeia

References

Tsumura Herb Handbook 
Bensky, Dan, Steve Clavey, Erich Stöger, and Andrew Gamble "Chinese Herbal Medicine: Materia Medica" 3rd ed. Eastland Press, 2004. Eastland Press Herb List Arranged by Pinyin
Wiseman, Nigel. "Learner's Disney Character Dictionary of Chinese Medicine"

External links
The World of Kampo

Kampo
Kampo
Kampo